A moko jumbie (also known as "moko jumbi" or "mocko jumbie") is a stilts walker or dancer. "Moko" means healer in Central Africa and "jumbi", a West Indian term for a ghost or spirit that may have been derived from the Kongo language word zumbi. The Moko Jumbies are thought to originate from West African tradition brought to the Caribbean.

A Moko Jumbie character may wear colorful garb and carnival masks.  Traditionally the face of a Moko Jumbie is completely covered, obscuring their human identity, even if they do not wear a decorative mask. They also frequent festivals and celebrations such as Trinidad and Tobago Carnival.

While the god Moko is from the Kongo (or Congo) and Nigeria, from the Maasai people, Trinidad and Tobago has added their own touch to him. Moko, in the traditional sense, is a god.  He watches over his village, and due to his towering height, he is able to foresee danger and evil. His name, Moko, literally means the “diviner” and he would be represented by men on towering stilts and performs acts that were unexplainable to the human eye.  In one remote tribe, the Moko rises from a regular man's height to the skies fluidly with no help and descends similarly to leave others to wonder how he performed such an act.

The Moko arrived in Trinidad man “walking all the way across the Atlantic Ocean from the West coast of Africa, laden with many, many centuries of experience, and, in spite of all inhuman attacks and encounters, yet still walks tall, tall, tall. (John Cupid, Caribbean Beat)” The idea of the Moko survived by living in the hearts of African descendants during slavery and colonial life to eventually walk the streets of Trinidad in a celebration of freedom, Carnival.  While this figure was rooted in African heritage, Trinidad adapted the figure, notably by adding on Jumbie or ghost to the name.  By the early 1900s Moko Jumbies had become an element of Trinidad's Carnival.  This figure would walk the streets of Port of Spain and other cities protecting the city and revelers from evil.  As part of his role in Carnival the Moko Jumbie would accept donations from onlookers in upper floors of buildings. However, his notable figure of Carnival slowly faded until a drastic revival.

By the early 1990s, Moko Jumbies were essentially non-existent in Carnival, until two men brought this tradition back. These men, namely Moose and Dragon, have brought the Moko Jumbie back to a place of prominence in Carnival and created a new kind of Moko Jumbie. There are two main Moko Jumbie bands in Trinidad, Watusi and Kilimanjaro, as well as several smaller ones.  So while the idea of the Moko came from Africa, Trinidad has made it its own.  

Farther north, in St. Croix, U.S. Virgin Islands, the tradition of Moko Jumbies have persisted and become a vibrant part of local culture, even being taught through after-school clubs to young performers, ensuring the traditions are passed along.

In popular culture
In 2009 the U.S. Department of Tourism of the U.S. Virgin Islands adopted the moko jumbie as a symbol for the islands.

In the late 2000s, Nick Jr. released an animated music video called "Papa Moco Jumbie," in which a little boy wants to dance like his father, a moko jumbie, in the carnival.

References

Afro-Caribbean culture
Afro–Trinidadian and Tobagonian culture
Democratic Republic of the Congo diaspora
Kongo culture
Nigerian diaspora in North America